Me Enamoré may refer to:

Me Enamoré (album), 1983 album by José Feliciano
"Me Enamoré" (Shakira song), 2017
"Me Enamoré", 1997 song by Chichí Peralta
"Me Enamoré", 2010 song by Angel & Khriz from the album Da' Take Over